Jontavious Braylon Sanders (born January 21, 1999) is an American football wide receiver for the Miami Dolphins of the National Football League (NFL). He played college football at Ole Miss.

Early life and high school
Sanders was born and raised in Hogansville, Georgia, and played high school football at Callaway High School. He committed to play college football at Ole Miss on February 1, 2017.

Professional career

Sanders was signed by the Miami Dolphins as an undrafted free agent on April 30, 2022, shortly after the conclusion of the 2022 NFL Draft. He was waived by the Dolphins on August 30, 2022, and re-signed to the practice squad. He signed a reserve/future contract on January 16, 2023.

References

External links
 Miami Dolphins bio
Ole Miss Rebels bio

1999 births
Living people
Players of American football from Georgia (U.S. state)
American football wide receivers
Ole Miss Rebels football players
Miami Dolphins players
People from Hogansville, Georgia